Bani Al-Harth is a sub-district located in As Sawd District, 'Amran Governorate, Yemen. Bani Al-Harth had a population of 2897 according to the 2004 census.

References 

Sub-districts in As Sawd District